The cadmium resistance (CadD) protein family (TC# 2.A.77) belongs to the Lysine exporter (LysE) superfamily. CadD members facilitate the export of cationic compounds such as cadmium ions.

Members
Currently, many sequenced proteins comprise the CadD family. Two are close orthologues in two Staphylococcus species that have been reported to function in cadmium resistance, a fourth has been reported to function in quaternary ammonium cation export, and the fourth is a distant open reading frame (ORF) in Staphylococcus aureus. These proteins are found in Gram-positive bacteria. Their mode of energy coupling has not been investigated, but is hypothesized to include a proton antiport mechanism. This family is distantly related to members of the LysE family (TC #2.A.75) and the RhtB family (TC #2.A.76). These three families, which are included in the LysE superfamily, all consist of proteins of similar sizes (about 200 residues) and topologies (6 putative transmembrane α-helical segments; 5 experimentally determined TMSs).

General Transport Reaction
The probable reaction catalyzed by these proteins is:

Cationic compound (in) + nH+ (out) → Cationic compound (out) + nH+ (in).

Further reading

References 

Solute carrier family
Protein families